Langston is a town in Jackson County, Alabama, United States, and is included in the Chattanooga-Cleveland-Dalton, TN-GA-AL Combined Statistical Area. As of the 2010 census, the population of the town was 270, up from 254.  Langston initially incorporated in 1899. At some point after 1920, it disincorporated and did not reincorporate again until 1980 (after the census was taken that year, since it did not appear on it). Its peak population was in 1920, when it had a population of 500.

History

Langston was settled in the 1810s, and was initially known as "Coffeetown" after the Coffee brothers, who were among the early settlers.  A post office was established in 1845 with Langston Coffee as the first postmaster.  In 1869, most of Coffeetown's residents moved to Texas, and the following year, James Morgan sold lots for the creation of a new town.  The new town was named "Langston" after Langston Coffee.

Langston initially thrived as a river port along the Tennessee River, eventually growing to include nine stores and a blacksmith shop.  With the rise of railroad traffic in the late 19th century and automobile traffic in the early 20th century, however, the town began to decline.  The construction of Guntersville Dam by the Tennessee Valley Authority in the late 1930s flooded a significant portion of the town, further reducing its population.

Geography
The town is situated on the eastern shore of the Tennessee River, at river mile 377. Sand Mountain rises immediately to the east of Langston. Scottsboro lies across the river to the north, and Section lies atop Sand Mountain to the northeast. County Road 67 connects Langston with State Route 35 to the northeast.

Demographics

As of the census of 2000, there were 254 people, 109 households, and 80 families residing in the town. The racial makeup of the town was 94.09% White, 3.15% Black or African American and 2.76% Native American.

There were 109 households, out of which 21.1% had children under the age of 18 living with them, 61.5% were married couples living together, 9.2% had a female householder with no husband present, and 25.7% were non-families. 25.7% of all households were made up of individuals, and 12.8% had someone living alone who was 65 years of age or older. The average household size was 2.33 and the average family size was 2.74.

In the town, the population was spread out, with 19.3% under the age of 18, 6.3% from 18 to 24, 22.4% from 25 to 44, 35.0% from 45 to 64, and 16.9% who were 65 years of age or older. The median age was 46 years. For every 100 females, there were 91.0 males. For every 100 females age 18 and over, there were 89.8 males.

The median income for a household in the town was $33,333, and the median income for a family was $42,344. Males had a median income of $26,750 versus $29,375 for females. The per capita income for the town was $16,266. About 2.7% of families and 6.7% of the population were below the poverty line, including none of those under the age of eighteen and 13.9% of those 65 or over.

References

External links

Towns in Jackson County, Alabama
Towns in Alabama
Alabama populated places on the Tennessee River